Kadamattathachan may refer to:

Kadamattathu Kathanar, a priest who is believed to have possessed supernatural powers and whose legends are closely related to the beginning of the Kadamattom Church.
Kadamattathachan (1984 film), Malayalam film released in 1984 starring Prem Nazir and Srividya